János Zemen is a Hungarian Olympic middle-distance runner. He represented his country in the men's 1500 meters at the 1976 Summer Olympics. His time was a 3:44.27 in the first heat, a 3:39.94 in the semifinals, and a 3:43.02 in the finals. He also competed in the men's 800 metres, posting a time of 1:47.40 in the heats.

References

1950 births
Living people
Hungarian male middle-distance runners
Olympic athletes of Hungary
Athletes (track and field) at the 1976 Summer Olympics
People from Vác
Sportspeople from Pest County
20th-century Hungarian people